The O'Day 240 is an American trailerable sailboat that was designed by C.R. Hunt & Associates as a cruiser and first built in 1988.

The O'Day 240 design was developed into the similar O'Day 250 in 1996.

Production
The design was built by O'Day Corp., as part of Lear Siegler, in the United States. The boat was built from 1988 until 1989, but it is now out of production.

Design
The O'Day 240 is a recreational keelboat, built predominantly of fiberglass, with wood trim. It has a masthead sloop rig, a raked stem, a plumb transom, a transom-hung rudder controlled by a tiller and a fixed wing keel. It displaces  and carries  of ballast.

The boat is normally fitted with a small  outboard motor for docking and maneuvering.

The design has sleeping accommodation for four people, with a double "V"-berth in the bow cabin and an aft cabin with a double berth on the starboard side. It also has two straight settees in the main cabin. The galley is located on the starboard side just forward of the companionway ladder. The galley is "L"-shaped and is equipped with a two-burner stove, an ice box and a sink. The head is located opposite the galley on the port side.

Operational history
In a 2010 review Steve Henkel wrote, "every year Sailing World magazine runs a Boat of the Year contest in which they pick a new sailboat from each of several categories. In the quarter century since the contest began only five monohull sailboats ... under 26 feet and with cruising accommodations—have been selected as winners. The O'Day 240 ... was the 1989 winner—the same year that O'Day, to the regret of many, ended their long participation in the sailboat market. Among the judges' comments: the 240's heavy weight and her long waterline for her size will give her 'punch and range that's often lacking in weekender/cruisers.' They also liked her enclosed head, large cockpit locker, and working galley, admired her sleek look, and felt sail and engine controls were within easy reach. Best features: We second the Sailing World comments. We also note that compared to her comp[etitor]s, the 240 has the most headroom and the largest Space Index. Also, the boat's winged keel affords shallow draft for gunkholing while giving sailing performance in the same general range as a deeper fin. Worst features: Compared to her comp[etitor]s, the 240 has the lowest Motion Index."

See also
List of sailing boat types

References

Keelboats
1980s sailboat type designs
Sailing yachts
Trailer sailers
Sailboat type designs by C. Raymond Hunt Associates
Sailboat types built by O'Day Corp.